Sara Maglio  (born 17 March 1978) is a Canadian soccer player who played as a forward for the Canada women's national soccer team. She was part of the team at the 1999 FIFA Women's World Cup.  Born in North Vancouver and raised in Coquitlam, BC, she attended Simon Fraser University.

References

External links
 
 

1978 births
Living people
Canadian women's soccer players
Canada women's international soccer players
Sportspeople from North Vancouver
Soccer people from British Columbia
1999 FIFA Women's World Cup players
Women's association football forwards